William Clement was an English priest.

Clement  was born in Mere, Wiltshire and educated at Christ Church, Oxford. Clement was Rector of Dauntsey from 1674, Master of St John's Hospital, Bath from 1684, and a Canon of Wells from 1689. Clement was Archdeacon of Bath from his appointment on 31 October 1690 until his death on 11 December 1711.

References

People from Mere, Wiltshire
Alumni of Christ Church, Oxford
Archdeacons of Bath
18th-century English Anglican priests
17th-century English Anglican priests
1711 deaths